Canada competed at the 2018 Winter Olympics in Pyeongchang, South Korea, from February 9 to 25, 2018. It was the nation's 23rd appearance at the Winter Olympics, having competed at every Games since their inception in 1924. Canada competed in all sports disciplines, except Nordic combined. The chef de mission was Isabelle Charest, who was appointed in February 2017.

On January 16, 2018, figure skaters Tessa Virtue and Scott Moir were announced as the country's flag bearers during the opening ceremony. This was the first time two athletes were named as Canada's opening ceremony flag bearer. On February 24, 2018, short track speed skater Kim Boutin was named the flag bearer for the closing ceremony.

Instead of setting a specific medal count as a target, the Canadian Olympic Committee aimed "to contend for No. 1" in the medal count. Private data analytics company Gracenote projected that the Canadian team would win 28 medals. Canada finished with 11 gold medals and 29 overall (ranking 3rd in both categories). This was the most successful Canadian performance in terms of overall medals, surpassing the 26 won at the 2010 Winter Olympics.

For the first time since its official introduction at the 1998 Winter Olympics, Canada failed to medal in men's and women's curling, but did win gold in mixed doubles curling, a category making its Olympic debut.

History

On Day 2 of the Games, Mark McMorris won the bronze medal in the men's slopestyle. This was eleven months after the snowboarder ended up in a coma.

Pairs skater Eric Radford became the first openly gay man to win a gold medal at any Winter Olympics, as part of the Canadian team that won the team figure skating competition. A corner of Canada Olympic House was set aside as Pride House for the duration of the Olympics.

Alex Gough won Canada's first ever permanent luge medal on February 13. She had been part of the 2014 luge relay team which briefly won a previous Olympic bronze due to a Russian doping disqualification, but that finding had been overturned on appeal.

On February 23, Canada broke its record for most ever Winter Olympic medals, previously at 26, with figure skater Kaetlyn Osmond winning the 27th medal.

A day before the closing ceremony, on February 24, Canada won its 28th medal when Sebastien Toutant took gold in the first ever "big air" competition in snowboarding. That medal was Canada's 500th Olympic medal (not counting two medals (gold and silver) at the 1906 Olympic Games).

Canada maintained its record for the most gold medals at a single Games—14 at Vancouver 2010—and now shares the honor with Norway and Germany, which equalled that mark at these Games.

Medalists

Competitors
The following is the list of number of competitors participating at the Games per sport/discipline.

Alpine skiing 

Canada qualified a total of 15 male and female athletes for alpine skiing. However they declined one spot. On January 31, 2018 Alpine Canada announced that Erik Guay was not able to return to health due to continuing severe back pain. Therefore, he will not compete at the upcoming Winter Olympics.

Men

Women

Mixed

Biathlon 

Based on their Nations Cup rankings in the 2016–17 Biathlon World Cup, Canada qualified five men and five women. The official team of ten athletes was named on January 16, 2018.

Men

Women

Mixed

Bobsleigh 

Canada qualified a full team of three sleds in the two-man, four-man and women's bobsleigh competitions each. The team will consist of 18 athletes, and also marked the largest bobsleigh team the country has ever sent to the Winter Olympics. The official team was named on January 24, 2018.

Men

* – Denotes the driver of each sled

- Sam Giguere and Joey Nemet will serve as the team's alternates.

Women

* – Denotes the driver of each sled

- Cynthia Appiah and Kristen Bujnowski will serve as the team's alternates.

Cross-country skiing 
Canada qualified a total of 8 male and female athletes for cross-country skiing and receive three additional quota places based on the reallocation process.  Seven male and four female competitors were announced on January 29.

Distance
Men

Women

Sprint
Men

Women

Curling

Canada qualified a full team of 12 athletes (6 men and 6 women). The country will compete in all three events, including the debuting mixed doubles event. The teams and the alternates for the men's and women's tournaments were announced officially on January 8, 2017.
Summary

Men's tournament

Canada qualified a men's team by earning enough points in the last two World Curling Championships. The Olympic team was decided at the 2017 Canadian Olympic Curling Trials.

The Canadian team consists of Kevin Koe, Marc Kennedy, Brent Laing, Ben Hebert, and Scott Pfeifer.

Round-robin
Canada has a bye in draws 4, 8 and 11.

Draw 1
Wednesday, 14 February, 09:05

Draw 2
Wednesday, 14 February, 20:05

Draw 3
Thursday, 15 February, 14:05

Draw 5
Friday, 16 February, 20:05

Draw 6
Saturday, 17 February, 14:05

Draw 7
Sunday, 18 February, 09:05

Draw 9
Monday, 19 February, 14:05

Draw 10
Tuesday, 20 February, 09:05

Draw 12
Wednesday, 21 February, 14:05

Semifinal
Thursday, 22 February, 20:05

Bronze-medal game
Friday, 23 February, 15:35

Women's tournament

Canada qualified a women's team by earning enough points in the last two World Curling Championships. The Olympic team was decided at the 2017 Canadian Olympic Curling Trials.

The Canadian team consists of Rachel Homan, Emma Miskew, Joanne Courtney, Lisa Weagle, and Cheryl Bernard.

Round-robin
Canada has a bye in draws 1, 5 and 9.

Draw 2
Thursday, 15 February, 09:05

Draw 3
Thursday, 15 February, 20:05

Draw 4
Friday, 16 February, 14:05

Draw 6
Saturday, 17 February, 20:05

Draw 7
Sunday, 18 February, 14:05

Draw 8
Monday, 19 February, 09:05

Draw 10
Tuesday, 20 February, 14:05

Draw 11
Wednesday, 21 February, 09:05

Draw 12
Wednesday, 21 February, 20:05

Mixed doubles

Canada qualified a mixed doubles team by earning enough points in the last two World Mixed Doubles Curling Championships. The Olympic team was decided at the 2018 Canadian Mixed Doubles Curling Olympic Trials. Former Olympic gold medallists John Morris and Kaitlyn Lawes won the trials, and were the mixed doubles representative for Canada.

Draw 1
Thursday, February 8, 9:05

Draw 2
Thursday, February 8, 20:04

Draw 3
Friday, February 9, 8:35

Draw 4
Friday, February 9, 13:35

Draw 5
Saturday, February 10, 9:05

Draw 6
Saturday, February 10, 20:04

Draw 7
Sunday, February 11, 9:05

Semifinal
Monday, February 12, 9:05

Final
Tuesday, February 13, 20:05

Figure skating 

Based on placements at the 2017 World Figure Skating Championships in Helsinki, Finland, Canada qualified 17 athletes (8 male and 9 female) across all four individual and pairs events. This meant Canada qualified the most figure skaters out of all nations. The team was announced after the conclusion of the 2018 Canadian Figure Skating Championships. Canada also qualified in the team event after finishing in first place in the overall qualification rankings.

Individual

Mixed

Team trophy

Freestyle skiing 

Aerials

Halfpipe

Moguls

Ski cross

Qualification legend: FA – Qualify to medal round; FB – Qualify to consolation round

Slopestyle

Ice hockey 

Canada qualified a men's and women's team for a total of 48 athletes (25 men and 23 women).

Summary

Men's tournament

Canada men's national ice hockey team qualified by finishing 1st in the 2015 IIHF World Ranking. The official roster of the games was announced on January 11, 2018. The team did not include any of Canada's National Hockey League players as the league decided to not participate at the games. This meant about 300 of the country's top players did not make the team.
Roster

Preliminary round

Quarterfinal

Semifinal

Bronze medal game

Women's tournament

Canada women's national ice hockey team qualified by finishing 2nd in the 2016 IIHF World Ranking.

Roster

Preliminary round

Semifinal

Final

Luge 

Based on results of the 2017–18 Luge World Cup, Canada qualified eight athletes and a relay team. The team consists of three athletes each in the individual events and a doubles sled. The team was officially named on December 20, 2017.

Men

Women

Mixed team relay

Short track speed skating 

Canada named its team of short track speed skaters in August 2017. Later in 2017 after the conclusion of the 2017–18 ISU Short Track Speed Skating World Cup, Canada qualified a full team of ten athletes (five per gender), allowing all athletes named to the team to compete. On January 25, 2018, Speed Skating Canada
officially unveiled the team and which events each athlete would compete in.

Men

Women

Qualification legend: ADV – Advanced due to being impeded by another skater;  AA – Advanced to final round due to being impeded by another skater; FA – Qualify to medal round; FB – Qualify to consolation round; OR – Olympic record

Skeleton 

Canada qualified the maximum team size of three men and three women. The team was officially announced on January 24, 2018.

Ski jumping 

Canada qualified two ski jumpers, one male and one female. The team was officially announced on January 24, 2018.

Snowboarding 

Canada qualified 21 athletes (ten men and eleven women), however returned its only quota for the women's parallel giant slalom, meaning only 20 athletes were officially named to the team (ten per gender). Canada's slopestyle and big air team of seven athletes was named on January 9, 2018. Canada's halfpipe, snowboard cross and alpine team of thirteen athletes was named on January 25, 2018. On January 30, 2018 Canada received an additional spot in men's snowboard cross, allowing Éliot Grondin to compete as the fourth Canadian in this event.

Freestyle
Men

Qualification Legend: QF – Qualify directly to final

Women

Qualification Legend: QF – Qualify directly to final

Parallel

Qualification Legend: W – Winner; L – Loser

Snowboard cross

Qualification legend: FA – Qualify to medal round; FB – Qualify to consolation round

Speed skating

Canada earned the following quotas at the conclusion of the four World Cup's used for qualification. Five athletes were pre-selected for the games after their results from the World Cup (Alex Boisvert-Lacroix, Ivanie Blondin, Ted-Jan Bloemen, Olivier Jean and Keri Morrison). The rest of the team will be named after the Canadian trials held in Calgary from January 4 to 9, 2018. The official team was named on January 10, 2018. The team consists of 19 athletes (10 men and 9 women), which is one less than the maximum the country could have sent to the games. Canada also did not nominate a third skater in the women's 500 and 1000 metres events.

Men

Women

Mass start

Team pursuit

See also
Canada at the 2018 Winter Paralympics
Canada at the 2018 Commonwealth Games
Canada at the 2018 Summer Youth Olympics

References

Nations at the 2018 Winter Olympics
2018
2018 in Canadian sports